The discography of Clay Aiken, an American pop music singer, consists of six studio albums, eighteen singles, one extended play, two Double A-side CDs (B-sides) and five music videos. 

After his appearance  on the second season of the television program American Idol in 2003 he signed with RCA Records. His first solo album, Measure of a Man (2003), debuted at number one on the Billboard 200. With 613,000 copies sold in its first week, this was the highest-selling debut for a solo artist in 10 years, and to date the highest debut of any Idol. The album received a double Platinum certification from the RIAA on November 17, 2003.

Aiken's second album was a holiday album titled Merry Christmas with Love (2004), which set a new record for fastest-selling holiday album in the Soundscan era (since 1991). The album debuted at number four on the Billboard 200 and tied Céline Dion's record for the highest debut by a holiday album in the history of Billboard magazine. Merry Christmas with Love sold over 1,000,000 copies retail in six weeks and was the best-selling holiday album of 2004, receiving RIAA Platinum certification on Jan. 6, 2005. This album was re-released in August 2009.

His third album A Thousand Different Ways (2006) debuted at number two on the Billboard 200 and his fourth album On My Way Here (2008) debuted at number four. His first four studio albums debuted in the top five on the Billboard 200.

After the release of On My Way Here, Aiken and RCA parted ways and he signed with Universal Music's Decca Records. His first album with Decca, Tried and True, was released on June 1, 2010 and debuted at number nine on the Billboard 200.

Albums

Studio albums

Compilation albums

EPs

Singles

"—" denotes releases that did not chart.

Double A-side CDs

"—" denotes releases that did not chart.

Single certifications

DVDs

Music videos

Other recordings

See also
List of number-one hits (United States)
List of artists who reached number one on the Hot 100 (U.S.)

References
Notes
A ^ RCA announced that Measure of a Man was certified 3× Platinum but it does not show on the RIAA list.
B ^ "On My Way Here" was released on the Super Hero (2008) album presented by MBA Sports, commemorating the 2008 Beijing Olympics.
C ^ "Without You" is a different song to Badfinger's "Without You".
D ^ "Proud of Your Boy" was recorded for Disney's DVD Aladdin Special Edition (2004). Video of Aiken singing with the orchestra is on the DVD.
E ^ "I Believe We Can" was recorded for Disney's Phineas and Ferb special "Summer Belongs to You". 
Footnotes

External links

Discographies of American artists
American Idol discographies
Pop music discographies